Bacterial small RNAs (sRNA) are an important class of regulatory molecules in bacteria such as Brucella. They are often bound to the chaperone protein Hfq, which allows them to interact with mRNA(s). In Brucella suis 1330 RNA sequencing identified a novel list of 33 sRNAs and 62 Hfq-associated mRNAs. In Brucella melitensis eight novel sRNA genes were identified  using bioinformatic and experimental approach. One of them BSR0602 was found to modulate the intracellular survival of  B. melitensis. BSR0441 sRNA was further investigated in this study and shown to play role in the intracellular survival. sRNA BM-sr0117 from Brucella melitensis was identified and shown to be bound to and cleaved by Bm-RNase III. AbcR and AbcR2 (orthologs of SmrC15 and SmrC16) were studied B. abortus. Seven novel sRNAs were validated and  their interaction with a putative target sequence was verified in B. abortus.

RNA chaperone Hfq link to Brucella virulence
Hfq protein regulates virB operon which is required for full virulence of the bacteria. It can bind to 5' untranslated region of virB transcriptional regulator BabR and mediate its effects on babR expression.

See also
 Bacillus subtilis BSR sRNAs
 Escherichia coli sRNA
 Mycobacterium tuberculosis sRNA
 Non-coding RNA
 Xanthomonas sRNA

References

Non-coding RNA